Dr. Susil Ranjan Chattopadhyay was an Indian politician. He was elected to the Lok Sabha, lower house of the Parliament of India from West Dinajpur, West Bengal as a member of the Indian National Congress.}

He was educated at Balurghat H. E. School, and later at Calcutta Medical College.

References

External links
Official Biographical Sketch in Lok Sabha Website

Indian National Congress politicians from West Bengal
India MPs 1952–1957
Lok Sabha members from West Bengal
1898 births
Year of death missing